Pterolabis is a genus of earwigs in the subfamily Isolabiinae. It was cited by Steinmann in The Animal Kingdom.

References

External links 
 The Earwig Research Centre's Pterolabis database Source for references: type Pterolabis in the "genus" field and click "search".

Anisolabididae
Dermaptera genera